3-Methylglutaconic aciduria (MGA) is any of at least five metabolic disorders that impair the body's ability to make energy in the mitochondria. As a result of this impairment, 3-methylglutaconic acid and 3-methylglutaric acid build up and can be detected in the urine.

3-Methylglutaconic acid is an organic acid.  The double carboxylic acid functions are the principal cause of the strength of this acid. 3-methylglutaconic acid can be detected by the presence of the acid function and the double connection that involves reactivity with some specific substances.

Genetics
The inheritance patterns of 3-methylglutaconic aciduria differ depending on the gene involved.

 Types I and III are inherited in an autosomal recessive pattern, which means two copies of the gene in each cell are altered. Most often, the parents of an individual with an autosomal recessive disorder are carriers of one copy of the altered gene but do not show signs and symptoms of the disorder.
 Type II is inherited in an X-linked recessive pattern. A condition is considered X-linked if the mutated gene that causes the disorder is located on the X chromosome, one of the two sex chromosomes. In males (who have only one X chromosome), one altered copy of the gene in each cell is sufficient to cause the condition. In females (who have two X chromosomes), a mutation must be present in both copies of the gene to cause the disorder. Males are affected by X-linked recessive disorders much more frequently than females. A striking characteristic of X-linked inheritance is that fathers cannot pass X-linked traits to their sons.
 The inheritance pattern of 3-methylglutaconic aciduria type IV is unknown.

Diagnosis
Diagnosis is typically post-mortem.

Classification
There are five known subgroups of MGA; MGA type I, II, III, IV & V.

The characteristic features of 3-methylglutaconic aciduria type I include speech delay, delayed development of both mental and motor skills (psychomotor delay), elevated levels of acid in the blood and tissues (metabolic acidosis), abnormal muscle tone (dystonia), and spasms and weakness affecting the arms and legs (spastic quadriparesis). Fewer than 20 cases of 3-methylglutaconic aciduria type I have been reported.

Barth syndrome is a common name for 3-methylglutaconic aciduria type II. The main features of Barth syndrome include a weakened and enlarged heart (dilated cardiomyopathy), recurrent infections due to low numbers of white blood cells (neutropenia), skeletal problems, and delayed growth. The incidence of 3-methylglutaconic aciduria type II is approximately 1 in 200,000 male infants.

Costeff syndrome is another name for 3-methylglutaconic aciduria type III. This disorder is characterized mainly by the degeneration of the optic nerves, which carry information from the eyes to the brain. Sometimes other nervous system problems occur, such as an inability to maintain posture, poor muscle tone, the development of certain involuntary movements (extrapyramidal dysfunction), and a general decrease in brain function (cognitive deficit). The incidence of 3-methylglutaconic aciduria type III is about 1 in 10,000 newborns in the Iraqi Jewish population. This disorder is extremely rare in all other populations.

The signs and symptoms of 3-methylglutaconic aciduria type IV are variable and overlap with types I-III. The incidence of 3-methylglutaconic aciduria type IV is unknown.

Treatment
There is no known treatment or cure.

Epidemiology 
3-Methylglutaconic aciduria seems to be  most prevalent amongst the Jewish population of Iraq. However, a high concentration of one type is found in the Saguenay-Lac-Saint-Jean region of Canada. This suggests that the disease is more frequent in insular areas where there is more likelihood that both parents are carriers, a higher birth rate, and a greater frequency of consanguineous marriages. As all types of 3-Methylglutaconic aciduria are known to be genetic diseases and show a recessive inheritance pattern, consanguineous marriages (in which both partners may have inherited the mutation from the same ancestor) increase the chances of having a baby with the condition.

References

External links 

    
 

Phospholipid metabolism disorders